Coleophora acuminatoides is a moth of the family Coleophoridae. It is found in Canada, including Nova Scotia.

The larvae feed on the seeds of Aster acuminatus. They create a trivalved, tubular silken case. It is similar in size to the case of Coleophora bidens, but differing in the paler colouration which in freshly formed cases is a light brown.

References

acuminatoides
Moths described in 1958
Moths of North America